The seventh and final season of the original Mission: Impossible originally aired Saturdays at 10:00–11:00 pm (EST) on CBS from September 16 to December 9, 1972 and Fridays at 8:00–9:00 pm (EST) from December 22, 1972 to March 30, 1973.

Cast

Episodes

References

7
1972 American television seasons
1973 American television seasons